Arlangkot is a town in Gulmi District part of the Musikot Municipality. At the time of the 1991 Nepal census it had a population of 2498 persons living in 424 individual households.

References

External links
UN map of the municipalities of Gulmi District

Populated places in Gulmi District